is a Japanese football player for Ehime FC.

Career statistics

Club
Updated to end of 2018 season.

1Includes Suruga Bank Championship.

Honours

Club
Kashima Antlers
Suruga Bank Championship (1) : 2013

References

External links

Profile at Albirex Niigata
Profile at Ehime FC

1988 births
Living people
Ritsumeikan University alumni
Association football people from Ehime Prefecture
Japanese footballers
J1 League players
J2 League players
Ehime FC players
Kashima Antlers players
Albirex Niigata players
Association football defenders